In functional programming, a functor is a design pattern inspired by the definition from category theory that allows one to apply a function to values inside a generic type without changing the structure of the generic type. In Haskell this idea can be captured in a type class:

class Functor f where
  fmap :: (a -> b) -> f a -> f b

with conditions called functor laws (where . stands for function composition),

fmap id = id
fmap (g . h) = (fmap g) . (fmap h)

In Scala a trait can be used:

trait Functor[F[_]] {
  def map[A,B](a: F[A])(f: A => B): F[B]
}

Functors form a base for more complex abstractions like Applicative Functor, Monad, and Comonad, all of which build atop a canonical functor structure. Functors are useful in modeling functional effects by values of parameterized data types. Modifiable computations are modeled by allowing a pure function to be applied to values of the "inner" type, thus creating the new overall value which represents the modified computation (which might yet to be run).

Examples 

In Haskell, lists are a simple example of a functor. We may implement  as

fmap f []     = []
fmap f (x:xs) = (f x) : fmap f xs

A binary tree may similarly be described as a functor:

data Tree a = Leaf | Node a (Tree a) (Tree a)
instance Functor Tree where
   fmap f Leaf         = Leaf
   fmap f (Node x l r) = Node (f x) (fmap f l) (fmap f r)

See also 

 Functor in category theory
 Applicative functor, a special type of functor

References

External links 
 Section about Functor in Haskell Typeclassopedia
 Chapter 11 Functors, Applicative Functors and Monoids in Learn You a Haskell for Great Good!
 Documentation for Functor in Cats library
 Section about Functor in lemastero/scala_typeclassopedia

Functional programming
Software design patterns
Programming idioms